Söğüt Dam is a dam in Kütahya Province, Turkey, built between 1980 and 1983. The development was backed by the Turkish State Hydraulic Works.

See also
List of dams and reservoirs in Turkey

References
DSI directory, State Hydraulic Works (Turkey), Retrieved December 16, 2009

Dams in Burdur Province